The Azerbaijan Cup 1994-95 was the fourth season of the annual cup competition in Azerbaijan with the final taking place on 28 May 1995.

First round

Round of 16

|}

Quarterfinals

|}

Semifinals

|}

Final

References

External links
Azerbaijan Cup
Azerbaijan Cup '94 RSSSF

Azerbaijan Cup seasons
Cup
Azerbaijan Cup